Lyuzen is a rural locality (a settlement) in Yayvinskoye Urban Settlement, Alexandrovsky District, Perm Krai, Russia. The population was 33 as of 2010.

Geography 
Lyuzen is located 43 km northwest of Alexandrovsk (the district's administrative centre) by road. Zheleznodorozhny is the nearest rural locality.

References 

Rural localities in Alexandrovsky District